HMS Hecate was the last ship completed of the four  breastwork monitors built for the Royal Navy during the 1870s.

Design and description 
The Cyclops-class ships were modified versions of the Cerberus class. They displaced . Their crew consisted of 156 officers and men. Hydra had two 4-cylinder inverted compound steam engines, each driving a single propeller shaft.

The ships mounted four 10-inch rifled muzzle-loading guns in twin-gun turrets fore and aft of the superstructure. The guns could fire both solid shot and explosive shells. They were mounted on carriages that used hydraulic jacks to elevate and depress the guns.

The gun turrets had 10 inches on their faces and 9 inches on the sides and rear.

Construction

References
 

 

Cyclops-class monitors
Monitors of the United Kingdom
1871 ships
Ships built in Cubitt Town